The Miller Range is a mountain range extending south from Nimrod Glacier for  along the western edge of the Marsh Glacier in Antarctica. Named for J.H. "Bob", now Sir Joseph Holmes Miller, a member of the New Zealand party of the Commonwealth Trans-Antarctic Expedition (1958) who, with G.W. Marsh, mapped this area.

References

Mountain ranges of Oates Land